This article shows all participating team squads at the 2014 FIVB Women's Club World Championship squads, held from May 7 to 11, 2014 in Zurich, Switzerland.

Pool A

SESI-SP
Head Coach:  Talmo de Oliveira

GS Petroliers
Head Coach:  Salim Achouri

Voléro Zürich
Head Coach:  Dragutin Baltić

Pool B

Dinamo Kazan
Head Coach:  Rishat Gilyazutdinov

Hisamitsu Springs
Head Coach:  Kumi Nakada

Molico/Osasco
Head Coach:  Luizomar de Moura

References 

2014 in volleyball
C